Velvet Colección (Velvet Collection) is a Spanish comedy-drama television series produced by Bambú Producciones for Movistar+. The series is the sequel to Velvet, which was created for Antena 3. The first season contains 10 episodes, and premiered on 21 September 2017 on #0 and Movistar+'s VOD service. The series, set in Barcelona in the 1960s, follows the opening of a new Galerías Velvet fashion store.

On 4 October 2017, the series was renewed for a second season.

The series was initially renewed for a third season in 2018, but on 8 March 2019, it was announced that instead of the third series, there would be a Christmas Special, shown in 2019, closing the series.

Premise
After three years living in New York City with her husband Alberto and their son, Ana Rivera returns to Spain to further expand their project. Alberto and Ana have managed the company from afar, and have ensured, together with their colleagues and friends, it stays a benchmark for fashion and innovation. Now the company is opening a new branch at Passeig de Gràcia in Barcelona, and the lead characters will leave Madrid in order to expand the universe of Velvet.

Cast

Main cast
Marta Hazas as Clara Montesinos Martín de Ruiz
Asier Etxeandia as Raúl de la Riva
Adrián Lastra as Pedro Infantes
Diego Martín as Enrique Otegui
Llorenç Gónzalez as Jonás Infantes
Imanol Arias as Eduard Godó
Andrea Duro as Marie Leduc
Adriana Ozores as Macarena Rey
Mónica Cruz as Carmela Cortés
Marta Torné as Paloma
Megan Montaner as Elena
Nacho Montes as Manuel "Manolito" Infantes Blázquez
Paula Usero as Inés
Fernando Guallar as Sergio Godó Rey
Raúl Prieto as Rafael Cortés "El aguja"

Recurring cast
Aitana Sánchez-Gijón as Blanca Soto Fernández
Javier Rey as Mateo Ruiz Lagasca
Miriam Giovanelli as Patricia "Patty" Marquez Campos vda. de Alcocér
Paula Echevarría as Ana Rivera López de Márquéz
José Sacristán as Emilio López
Amaia Salamanca as Bárbara de Senillosa de Otegui
Lucía Diez as Lourdes "Lourditas" Otegui de Senillosa
Aitor Luna as Humberto Santamaría
Miguel Ángel Silvestre as Alberto Márquez Navarro

Episodes

Season 1 (2017)

Season 2 (2018)

Special (2019)

Reception

Awards and nominations

References

External links

Spanish-language television shows
2017 Spanish television series debuts
2019 Spanish television series endings
Movistar+ network series
Television shows set in Barcelona
2010s Spanish drama television series
Television series by Bambú Producciones